Budrio is a town and comune in the Metropolitan City of Bologna, in Emilia-Romagna, Italy; it is  east of Bologna.

Budrio is the birthplace of Giuseppe Barilli, better known under his pseudonym of Quirico Filopanti, an Italian mathematician and politician.

History
Budrio's area was a Roman colony, whose territory was divided between veteran legionaries. The current town was however founded in the 10th-11th centuries AD. The church of San Lorenzo was already active in 1146. In the 14th century Cardinal Gil de Albornoz rebuilt it as a castle, of which the two large towers (1376) can still be seen, while of the walls only a small section remains.

Main sights
The most notable attraction are the Bentivoglio castle (16th century) and the Villa Ranuzzi Cospi at Bagnarola. The town also houses the Pinacoteca (painting gallery) Domenico Inzaghi and the churches of San Domenico del Rosario, San Lorenzo, and Santi Gervasio e Protasio.

Notable people
Giuseppe Donati, inventor of the ocarina
Pierpaolo Donati, sociologist and philosopher of social science
Quirico Filopanti, mathematician and politician
Gustavo Fiorini, retired footballer
Marcello Massarenti, papal almoner (Vatican official)

Sister cities
  Gyula, Hungary, since 1965
  Eichenau, Germany, since 1991

References

External links
Official website 
Radio Budrio

Cities and towns in Emilia-Romagna